Louise Hall Tharp (1898–1992) was an American biographer.


Childhood and family

She was born in Oneonta, New York, but when she was very young the family moved to Springfield, Massachusetts, where her father was vicar of the North Congregational Church. She trained as an artist for two years at the School of the Museum of Fine Arts, Boston, then went with her father on a tour of Europe. She married Carey Hunter Tharp of Huntsville, Texas.  The couple had two sons, Carey Edwin, Jr., and Marshall.  they lived in Darien, Connecticut.

Writing
Tharp published four books of historical fiction before she wrote her first biography, Champlain: Northwest Voyager.

Books

Biographies
 Champlain: Northwest Voyager, Little Brown, 1944.
 Company of adventurers; the story of the Hudson's bay company, Little, Brown and Co., 1946.
 The Peabody Sisters of Salem (Little, Brown and Company: Boston, 1950). 
 Until Victory: Horace Mann and Mary Peabody (Boston: Little, Brown, 1953).
  Three Saints and a Sinner: Julia Ward Howe, Louisa, Annie and Sam, Little Brown and Co. 1956
 Adventurous alliance; the story of the Agassiz family of Boston, Little, Brown, 1959.
 Louis Agassiz, adventurous scientist, Little, Brown, 1961.
 The Baroness and the General, Little, Brown and Company, Boston/Toronto, 1962.
 Mrs. Jack; a biography of Isabella Stewart Gardner, Boston, Little, Brown, 1965. 
 Saint-Gaudens and the gilded era, Little, Brown, 1969.
 The Appletons of Beacon Hill, Little, Brown and Company, 1973.

Books for children
 Down to the sea; a young people's life of Nathaniel Bowditch, the great American navigator,  R.M. McBride and Company, 1942.
 Tory Hole; a young people's account of the Tory attack on Middlesex Parish, CT during the Revolutionary War, Darien Community Assoc., Inc. 1940/1976.
 Sixpence for Luck; a young people's look at colonial life in New London, Ct, Thomas Y. Crowell Co., 1941
 Champlain: Northwest Voyager; the adventure story of a pioneer of The New World. Peakirk Books, 1946

References

External links
 The Louise Hall Tharp papers, 1949–1953 are located in the Northeastern University Libraries, Archives and Special Collections Department, Boston, MA.

1898 births
1992 deaths
20th-century American biographers
American women biographers
20th-century American women